Charles Anthony Vinson (born January 5, 1944 in Washington, D.C.) is a retired American professional baseball player. A first baseman, he had an 11-year professional career, although his tenure in Major League Baseball consisted of 13 games for the 1966 California Angels.

Career
Vinson was signed originally by the New York Yankees but played only one year in the Rookie-level Appalachian League before the Angels selected him in the  first-year player draft. He spent three full years in the Angels' farm system and was called up in September 1966 after a 19-home run, 84-RBI season in the Pacific Coast League.  He started seven games at first base during the 1966 season's final month. On September 25, against the eventual world champion Baltimore Orioles, Vinson collected two hits and four runs batted in, paving the way to a 6–1 Angel victory. One of the hits was Vinson's only MLB home run, hit off relief pitcher Eddie Fisher, a knuckleballer. Vinson's home run came when he was given a second chance after Orioles second baseman Bob Johnson dropped a foul fly hit by Vinson for an error.

Vinson also had two doubles among his four Major League hits to go along with his home run.  He retired in 1973.

References

External links

1944 births
Living people
African-American baseball players
American expatriate baseball players in Canada
American expatriate baseball players in Mexico
Baseball players from Washington, D.C.
California Angels players
El Paso Sun Kings players
Harlan Yankees players
Hawaii Islanders players
Indios de Ciudad Juárez (minor league) players
Major League Baseball first basemen
Mexican League baseball players
Phoenix Giants players
Quad Cities Angels players
Salt Lake City Angels players
Seattle Angels players
Vancouver Mounties players
21st-century African-American people
20th-century African-American sportspeople